is a passenger railway station in the city of Tsukubamirai, Ibaraki Prefecture, Japan, operated by the third-sector railway operating company Metropolitan Intercity Railway Company. Its station number is TX16.

Lines
Only "Semi Rapid" and all-stations "Local" services stop at this station.

Station layout
The station consists of two side platforms serving two tracks situated on the first basement ("B1F") level.

Platforms

History
The station opened on 24 August 2005, coinciding with the opening of the Tsukuba Express line.

Passenger statistics
In fiscal 2019, the station was used by an average of 5479 passengers daily (boarding passengers only).

Bus services
The station is served by buses operated by Kantō Railway and also Mirai community buses operated by Tsukubamirai.

See also
 List of railway stations in Japan

References

External links

 TX Miraidaira Station 

Railway stations in Ibaraki Prefecture
Stations of Tsukuba Express
Railway stations in Japan opened in 2005
Tsukubamirai, Ibaraki